Fruitland Park is a city in Lake County, Florida, United States. The population was 4,078 at the 2010 census. The Census Bureau estimated the population in 2018 to be 10,122. It is part of the Orlando–Kissimmee–Sanford Metropolitan Statistical Area.

Geography

According to the United States Census Bureau, the city has a total area of 9.5 km2 (3.7 mi2), of which 7.6 km2 (2.9 mi2) is land and 1.9 km2 (0.8 mi2) (20.44%) is water.

Demographics

As of the census of 2000, there were 3,186 people, 1,192 households, and 890 families residing in the city. The population density was 421.3/km2 (1,092.1/mi2). There were 1,288 housing units at an average density of 170.3/km2 (441.5/mi2). The racial makeup of the city was 89.08% White, 7.16% African American, 0.56% Native American, 1.32% Asian, 0.06% Pacific Islander, 0.63% from other races, and 1.19% from two or more races. Hispanic or Latino of any race were 2.54% of the population.

There were 1,192 households, out of which 37.2% had children under the age of 18 living with them, 56.1% were married couples living together, 14.2% had a female householder with no husband present, and 25.3% were non-families. 20.8% of all households were made up of individuals, and 8.9% had someone living alone who was 65 years of age or older. The average household size was 2.67 and the average family size was 3.07.

In the city, the population was spread out, with 27.9% under the age of 18, 8.6% from 18 to 24, 29.2% from 25 to 44, 22.3% from 45 to 64, and 12.0% who were 65 years of age or older. The median age was 36 years. For every 100 females, there were 93.2 males. For every 100 females age 18 and over, there were 88.2 males.

The median income for a household in the city was $40,403, and the median income for a family was $42,665. Males had a median income of $29,375 versus $19,951 for females. The per capita income for the city was $16,400. About 8.1% of families and 10.2% of the population were below the poverty line, including 14.0% of those under age 18 and 3.0% of those age 65 or over. As of 2018 population is around 6,000 as the villages have built hundreds of new homes.

History

Fruitland Park antedates the American Civil War, although the name of the town only came later, as it was originally called Gardenia. The earliest settler was M. Calvin Lee, of the Evander Lee family of Leesburg, who planted a citrus grove. After the war, a son-in-law of the Lee family, P.S. Bouknight, homesteaded  near Mirror Lake.

In 1875, the State of Florida sent Captain Kendricks to the northern part of the United States to talk about the advantages of living in Florida. Due to Major Orlando P. Rooks' poor health, and already considering a move, he had his wife, Josephine, moved to Fruitland Park. They built their first home on Crystal Lake in 1877. It was here that the first white child, Frederic, was born in 1882.

The Fruitland Nurseries of Augusta, Georgia, was owned by J. P. Berckmann, friend of Major Rook. Major Rook named the town Fruitland Park for the nurseries, and the main street Berckmann Street for this friend.

The postal authorities refused to recognize the name Fruitland Park as there was already a Fruitland in the state. At their request, the name was changed to Gardenia in 1884. The Florida Railroad, put through the town just prior to this, had listed the town as Fruitland Park in all their printed matter and refused to recognize the new name of Gardenia. Consequently, all freight and express had to be directed to Fruitland Park and all mail addressed to Gardenia. This caused a great deal of confusion, which lasted from 1884 to 1888, when a petition was sent to the postal authorities to have the name changed back to Fruitland Park. The petition was granted in 1888.

On December 20, 1884, Rev. G.W. Butler organized the first "community" church in Fruitland Park, it was called the Community Church a Methodist Episcopal church founded by the Illinois conference. The church had acquired lots on College Ave., between Fountain St. and Lime St. The church was built in 1886–1887.  That building burned in 1934, but was rebuilt in 1935. That building was later sold to the United Pentecostal Church and still remains today.

Fruitland Park was granted a Charter by the state on May 25, 1927.

Today the city boasts churches, schools, and numerous businesses.  It still calls itself "Hometown USA."

Fruitland Park is also home to the oldest Dirt Kart Track in America. The 1/8 mile clay oval kart track has hosted Saturday Night Dirt Kart Racing for Go Kart enthusiasts since opening in 1958.

Expansion of The Villages

On December 10, 2013, The Villages of Lake-Sumter Inc. closed on a deal to purchase property in Fruitland Park for $8 million from a private owner. Subsequently, they also began the annexation and rezoning process with the city.  The property is currently the construction site for 2,038 new Villages homes, a project with final completion projected sometime in 2016. It was determined that the city of Fruitland Park stands to earn approximately $13 million in impact fees and building permits as a result of the expansion, not including ongoing tax revenues upon completion.

Notable People 

 Lillian Vickers-Smith, first female sports editor in the United States

See also
 Lake Griffin State Park

References

External links

 City of Fruitland Park

Cities in Lake County, Florida
Greater Orlando
Cities in Florida